Thales Defense & Security, Inc. (formerly Thales Communications Inc.), a subsidiary of the Thales Group, is a leading manufacturer of tactical communications equipment, including the AN/PRC-148 MBITR and JEM (JTRS Enhanced Module), currently fielded with the US Army and NATO forces worldwide. It is currently involved in the Joint Tactical Radio System program, fielding its JEM MBITR radio.

Sources

Defense companies of the United States
Telecommunications companies of the United States
Thales Group divisions and subsidiaries